Scottish Hockey currently runs three men's national outdoor leagues and two women's national outdoor leagues. The season runs from September to May, with a break in winter for the Indoor league. The winners of the Premiership (both men's and women's) are declared Scottish Champions.

Men's Premiership

The Men's Premiership (formerly Men's Nation League Division 1) is the top of the top tier of men's field hockey in Scotland. The winners are crowned as Scottish Hockey champions. At the end of the season, the top four teams enter a playoff to see who plays in the EHL. First plays fourth and second play third - the two winners' then play in a grand finale at the Glasgow National Hockey Centre. In recent years, this has been streamed live on Scottish Hockey's YouTube channel. The bottom two sides are relegated to division 2.

Past winners

Men's National League Division 2
The Men's National League Division 2 is the second strand of the top tier of men's field hockey in Scotland. First and second are promoted to the Men's National League Division 1. The bottom side is relegated to division 3.

Past winners

Men's National League Division 3
The Men's National League Division 3 is the third and lowest strand of the top tier of men's field hockey in Scotland. First is promoted to the Men's National League Division 1. There is no relegation from division 3 however teams can opt to move down to the regional leagues.

Past winners

Women's Premiership
The Women's Premiership (formerly Women's National League Division 1) is the top of the top tier of women's field hockey in Scotland. The winners are crowned as Scottish Hockey champions. At the end of the season, the top four teams enter a playoff to see who plays in the EHL. First plays fourth and second plays third - the two winners then play in a grand final at the Glasgow National Hockey Centre. In recent years, this has been streamed live on Scottish Hockeys YouTube channel. The bottom two sides are relegated to division 2.

Past winners

Women's National League Division 2
The Women's National League Division 2 is the second and lowest strand of the top tier of women's field hockey in Scotland. First is promoted to the women's National League Division 2. There is no relegation from division 2 however teams can opt to move down to the regional leagues.

References

Field hockey competitions in Scotland
Scotland
Hockey
1975 establishments in Scotland
Scot
Scot